Aenigmatineidae is a family of basal Lepidoptera, moths discovered on Kangaroo Island in South Australia by Dr Richard Glatz. The family is based on a single species discovered in 2015, Aenigmatinea glatzella, commonly known as the enigma moth. The larvae feed on conifers by mining the stem of Callitris plants in the cypress family. The adult has highly reduced mouthparts but its position in the Glossata containing the more familiar moths-with-tongues is confirmed by morphological and DNA sequence similarity. The group is best treated as a sister of the family Neopseustidae.

References

Moth families
Moths of Australia
Monogeneric insect families